Tusk is the twelfth studio album by British-American rock band Fleetwood Mac, released as a double album on 12 October 1979 by Warner Bros. Records. It is considered more experimental than their previous albums, partly as a consequence of Lindsey Buckingham's sparser songwriting arrangements and the influence of post-punk. The production costs were initially estimated to be about $1 million but many years later were revealed to be about $1.4 million (equivalent to $ in ), making it the most expensive rock album recorded to that date.

The band embarked on a nine-month tour to promote Tusk. They travelled extensively across the world, including the U.S., Australia, New Zealand, Japan, France, Belgium, Germany, the Netherlands, and the UK. In Germany, they shared the bill with Bob Marley. On this world tour, the band recorded music for the Fleetwood Mac Live album, released in 1980.

Compared to 1977's Rumours, which sold ten million copies by February 1978, Tusk was regarded as a commercial failure by the label, selling four million copies. In 2013, NME ranked Tusk at number 445 in their list of "500 Greatest Albums of All Time". The album was also included in the book 1001 Albums You Must Hear Before You Die. In 2000, it was voted number 853 in Colin Larkin's All Time Top 1000 Albums.

Background
Going into Tusk, Lindsey Buckingham was adamant about creating an album that sounded nothing like Rumours: "For me, being sort of the culprit behind that particular album, it was done in a way to undermine just sort of following the formula of doing Rumours 2 and Rumours 3, which is kind of the business model Warner Bros. would have liked us to follow." Mick Fleetwood decided early on that Tusk was to be a double album. After their label turned down Fleetwood's request to buy a new studio to make the record, the band used some of their royalties to construct their own Studio D.

Even with the custom studio, Warner Brothers still charged the band for the recording sessions. Production costs rose beyond a million dollars, far more than Rumours. Regarding the album's production costs, guitarist Lindsey Buckingham stated: "During the making of Tusk, we were in the studio for about 10 months and we got 20 songs out of it. Rumours took the same amount of time. It [Rumours] didn't cost so much because we were in a cheaper studio. There's no denying what it cost, but I think it's been taken out of context."

After the studio was built, Buckingham queried Fleetwood about recording some songs at his home studio. Fleetwood acquiesced, but told Buckingham that the other members needed to be integrated at some point. Most of Buckingham's demos were augmented with contributions from other members. Fleetwood overdubbed his drums over Buckingham's snare-drum track, which he sometimes played on a Kleenex box. Despite this, three tracks were recorded solely by Buckingham: "The Ledge", "Save Me a Place", and "That's Enough For Me". Producer Ken Caillat commented on Buckingham's obsessive nature in the studio: "He was a maniac. The first day, I set the studio up as usual. Then he said, 'Turn every knob 180 degrees from where it is now and see what happens.' He'd tape microphones to the studio floor and get into a sort of push-up position to sing. Early on, he came in and he'd freaked out in the shower and cut off all his hair with nail scissors. He was stressed."

Buckingham – infatuated with bands such as Talking Heads – was "desperate to make Mac relevant to a post-punk world", according to music journalist Bob Stanley, who commented that, compared to Rumours, Tusk was "unleavened weirdness, as close to its predecessor as the Beach Boys' lo-fi Smiley Smile had been to Pet Sounds. Much of it sounded clattery, half-formed, with strange rhythmic leaps and offbeat tics." Journalist Adam Webb described the Tusk recording sessions as a "cocaine blizzard" from which Christine McVie's then-boyfriend, Beach Boy drummer Dennis Wilson, "never really came out." Music historian Domenic Priore claimed that, for research purposes during the album's recording, Buckingham accessed the master tapes for the Beach Boys' unreleased album Smile, and that the tracks "That's All For Everyone" and "Beautiful Child" most strongly exemplify its influence.

Bassist John McVie commented that the album "sounds like the work of three solo artists", while Fleetwood said it was his second favourite Fleetwood Mac studio album behind Then Play On. "You got that sweetness [from Nicks and McVie] and me as the complete nutcase," Buckingham observed. "That's what makes us Fleetwood Mac."

Release and reception

Tusk peaked at number four on the Billboard 200 in the United States, but spent less than nine months on the chart. It was certified double platinum for shipping two million copies. It peaked at number one in the UK and achieved a platinum award for shipments in excess of 300,000 copies. The album gave the group two US top-10 hit singles, with the Buckingham-penned title track (US number eight/UK number six), and the Stevie Nicks composition "Sara" (US number seven/UK number 37).

In his review for Rolling Stone, Stephen Holden emphasized the experimental nature of the album, comparing it to the Beatles' "White Album" in that "Tusk is less a collection of finished songs than a mosaic of pop-rock fragments by individual performers." Robert Christgau of The Village Voice was more ambivalent, lauding Buckingham's production and experimentation, while dismissing Christine McVie's and Stevie Nicks's contributions. Retrospectively, AllMusic's Stephen Thomas Erlewine found the album to be timeless, calling it "a peerless piece of pop art" that rivals the more accessible Rumours album in terms of quality. Amanda Petrusich of Pitchfork found the album "self indulgent" and "terrifically strange". Contemporary and retrospective reviewers alike have noted the stark contrast between the album's lush opening track, "Over and Over", and jarring production of the following track, "The Ledge".

Though the album sold four million copies worldwide, and earned a Grammy nomination in 1981 for its art design in the category "Best Album Package", the band's record label deemed the project a failure, laying the blame squarely with Buckingham (considering the comparatively huge sales of Rumours and the album's unprecedented recording expense). Fleetwood, however, blames the album's relative failure on the RKO radio chain playing the album in its entirety prior to release, thus allowing mass home recording. In addition, Tusk was a double album, with a high list price of US$16.00, or $56.00 in 2019 terms.

Further releases from the album "Not That Funny" (UK-only single release), "Think About Me", and "Sisters of the Moon" were slightly remixed for radio, and were less successful. The latter two appear in their 'single versions' on the 2002 compilation The Very Best of Fleetwood Mac, while "Sara", which was cut to 4 minutes for both the single and the first CD release of the album, appears in its unedited form on the 1988 Greatest Hits compilation, the 2002 release The Very Best of Fleetwood Mac, and the 2004 reissue of Tusk.

Track listing

Notes:

On earlier CD pressings, "Sara" is edited to 4:39.
The CD mixes of "Not That Funny" and "I Know I'm Not Wrong" differ from their LP mixes.

Personnel
Fleetwood Mac
Lindsey Buckingham – vocals, guitars, bass guitar, keyboards, drums, percussion
Stevie Nicks – vocals, tambourine
Christine McVie – vocals, keyboards, piano, organ, accordian
John McVie – bass guitar
Mick Fleetwood – drums, percussion

Additional musicians
Peter Green – guitar 
USC Trojan Marching Band – horns and percussion 

Production and design
Fleetwood Mac – producers
Richard Dashut – producer, engineer
Ken Caillat – producer, engineer, remastering
Rich Feldman – assistant engineer
Hernán Rojas – assistant engineer
Ken Perry – mastering
Peter Beard – photography
Jayme Odgers – photography
Norman Seeff – photography
Vigon Nahas Vigon – art direction, design

Charts

Weekly charts

Year-end charts

Certifications

See also 
 Album era

References

Bibliography

External links

Tusk (Adobe Flash) at Radio3Net (streamed copy where licensed)

1979 albums
Albums produced by Christine McVie
Albums produced by John McVie
Albums produced by Ken Caillat
Albums produced by Lindsey Buckingham
Albums produced by Mick Fleetwood
Albums produced by Richard Dashut
Albums recorded in a home studio
Fleetwood Mac albums
Warner Records albums
Rhino Records albums